Scharfeneck may refer to:
Schloss Scharfeneck, now Sarny Court and Park, Poland
Burg Scharfeneck, Austria
Alt-Scharfeneck Castle ("Old Scharfeneck castle"), West Germany
Neuscharfeneck Castle ("New Scharfeneck castle"), West Germany
Former name of hamlet Sarny, Lower Silesian Voivodeship, now attached to Ścinawka Górna, Poland